The Humans is a puzzle-platform video game developed by Imagitec Design in Dewsbury, England and originally published by Mirage Technologies for the Amiga in May 1992. It was later ported to other home computers and consoles. The goal of the game varies per level but usually revolves around bringing at least one of the player-controlled humans to the designated end area marked by a colored tile. Doing this requires players taking advantage of the tribe's ability to build a human ladder and use tools such as spears, torches, wheels, ropes and a witch doctor in later levels.

The Humans was conceived by Rodney Humble during his time working with Imagitec Design as a project for the Atari Lynx spawning a trilogy based upon the human evolution inspired by Psygnosis Lemmings, creating and drawing his ideas before transferring the design work to Imagitec programmers in developing them further, serving as the first game to be published by MicroProse offshoot Mirage, while Atari Corporation liked the title and commissioned two additional conversions for their platforms.

The Humans was very well received by video game magazines and garnered praise for the originality, presentation and audio upon its initial Amiga launch. Other versions of the game have been met with a more mixed reception from critics and reviewers alike. It was followed by three sequels: The Humans: Insult to Injury in 1992, Humans 3: Evolution - Lost in Time in 1995, and The Humans: Meet the Ancestors! in 2009.

Gameplay 

The Humans is a puzzle game similar to Lemmings whose objective is to manipulate the given number of humans, taking advantage of abilities and tools to achieve the level's goal, usually consisting of finding a certain tool, killing a certain number of dinosaurs or bringing at least one human to the end point, marked by a conspicuous colored tile. Each level is independent of the next, each with its own tools, goal, and set number of humans allowed per level. The only things that carry from level to level are the total number of humans in the player's tribe and the player's total score.

The player controls one human at a time, and may switch between any human at any time. In order to complete a level, it is often necessary to use certain tools or abilities, such as stacking to reach a high ledge. For instance, the spear, a tool obtained in the first level of the game, may be thrown across gaps to other humans, used to jump chasms, thrown to kill dinosaurs or other enemies, or brandished to hold off dinosaurs temporarily. Certain levels also feature NPCs like the pterodactylus that can be ridden in order to reach otherwise unreachable platforms, that cannot be controlled, but can be used to the player's advantage. Several forms of enemy appear and can range from dinosaurs that eat a human if he is unarmed and within its walking range to spear-wielding members of enemy tribes.

There can be up to eight controllable humans in a level, though some levels only allow as few as three. Though there is a preset number of humans allowed per level, there is no limit to how many humans are in the player's tribe. If a human dies, he is replaced by one from the tribe as long as there are humans there to replace him. During the course of the game, the player is given chances to rescue other humans and add them to their tribe. If there are fewer humans in the player's tribe than the minimum required number for any given level, the game is over. Each level, however, has a password that can be used to jump to that particular level from the beginning of the game.

Development 

The Humans was the creation of former Imagitec Design designer Rodney Humble during his time working at the company in Dewsbury who, inspired by Psygnosis Lemmings and its puzzle elements, created and drew his ideas on storyboards before transferring his work to the Imagitec programmers, developing them further into a trilogy based upon the human evolution. Coding on the project started in December 1991, with Suspicious Cargo programmer David Lincoln being responsible for the Amiga version, although design work originally started on the Atari Lynx under the working titles Dino Dudes and Dino World. Atari Corporation reportedly liked the game and commissioned Imagitec with two additional conversions for their Atari Falcon and Atari Jaguar platforms respectively.

The Humans creation process was overseen by co-producers Martin Hooley and Simon Golding, the latter of which oversaw all versions of the game. Golding stated that the production was inspired by Lemmings instead of being "a rip-off" but focusing towards "bigger graphics", a cartoon-esque feeling reminiscent of short films like Tom and Jerry, more varied levels, among other features. Lincoln employed Cross Products SNASM programming tool to write the code on an editor using a PC before porting it to Amiga for testing. Artists Andrew Gilmour and Michael Hanrahan drew the pixel art, while composers Barry Leitch and Ian Howe were responsible for the soundtrack. Other members at Imagitec were also involved in the title's production across every subsequent version released.

Release 
The Humans was first launched in Europe for the Amiga in May 1992 by MicroProse offshoot Mirage Technologies, serving as their first title to be published, shortly after Lemmings was released hoping to capitalize the popularity of this style of game. GameTek and Mirage later published the PC version in June 1992 in North America and Europe. Other known commercial ports of the game include: Amiga CD32, Atari Jaguar, Atari Lynx, Atari Falcon, Game Boy, Sega Genesis and Super Nintendo Entertainment System. The Genesis version differs slightly from the other versions of this game in that the levels are in a different order than in the Amiga and PC versions. In addition, the Genesis version requires the player to choose between hearing sound effects or a music track, unlike the PC and Amiga versions, which utilize both simultaneously. A Nintendo Switch port featuring three versions of the game is scheduled for a future release by Piko Interactive and QUByte Interactive. The Jaguar version was included as part of the Atari 50: The Anniversary Celebration compilation for Nintendo Switch, PlayStation 4, Steam, and Xbox One.

Cancelled ports 
Ports of The Humans for both Game Gear and NEC PC-9801 were under development by Imagitec Design, although the latter never materialized. The Game Gear version was reviewed by Sega Pro magazine in their May 1993 issue, obtaining a 75 out of 100 score, but ultimately went unreleased for unknown reasons.

Reception 

The Amiga and PC versions of The Humans received excellent reviews, while those of versions ported to other consoles were more lukewarm. Ashley Cotter-Cairn, of Amiga Mania, gave the Amiga version an overall score of 93% and ranked it number 1 claiming "The Humans has everything: great graphics, including a variety of backdrops, some neat sound...(she's) pleased to say that those long months at the keyboard were worth every second". Computer Gaming World called the PC version of The Humans "delightful". While stating that the VGA graphics' limited color palette resembled those of a console game more than a computer's, it liked the soundtrack and documentation. The magazine concluded that while "not quite the calibre of Lemmings ... In all, much pleasure is to be had".

Reviewing the Genesis version, the four reviewers of Electronic Gaming Monthly praised the game's twist on the Lemmings formula and the high level of challenge in the later levels. However, all but one of the reviewers complained that the game's slow pace is aggravating, especially since a single mistake can force the player to restart an entire level.

Electronic Gaming Monthly said of the Jaguar version that "the graphics are pretty good and the control is adequate. An OK game". GamePro was more critical, commenting that the backgrounds are more detailed and colorful than in the Genesis version but that the game is still graphically subpar given the Jaguar's capabilities. They also criticized the stiff controls and lack of multiplayer modes, but still rated it as one of the better Jaguar games to date due to the "brain-twisting" gameplay. The Jaguar version has sold nearly 19,000 copies since its release as of 1 April 1995, though it is unknown how many were sold in total during its lifetime.

Legacy 
Following the success of The Humans, a sequel titled The Humans: Insult to Injury was launched in 1992 as both a stand-alone release or as an expansion pack. In 1993, the two games were combined and released for both Amiga CD32 and PC under the name Humans 1 and 2. In 1995, a third entry in the series titled Humans 3: Evolution - Lost in Time was released, keeping to the original game idea but differs from the original entry in storyline, gameplay style, and level continuity. Between 1994 and 2001, the trademarks for the Atari Jaguar version were abandoned and cancelled respectively. About a decade after GameTek declared bankruptcy, Deep Silver released a fourth entry for Microsoft Windows and Nintendo DS under the name The Humans: Meet the Ancestors!, retaining the same general gameplay style but improved the graphics and added more interactive objects and enemies.

Notes

References

External links 
 Dinolympics at AtariAge
 Evolution: Dino Dudes at AtariAge
 The Humans at GameFAQs
 The Humans at Giant Bomb
 The Humans at MobyGames

1992 video games
Amiga games
Amiga 1200 games
Atari games
Atari Jaguar games
Atari Lynx games
Atari ST games
Cancelled Game Gear games
Amiga CD32 games
DOS games
Game Boy games
GameTek games
Imagitec Design games
Mirage Technologies (Multimedia) Ltd. games
Piko Interactive games
Prehistoric people in popular culture
Puzzle video games
Sega Genesis games
Super Nintendo Entertainment System games
Video game franchises
Video game franchises introduced in 1992
Video games developed in the United Kingdom
Video games scored by Barry Leitch
Video games scored by Ian Howe
Video games set in prehistory
Windows games
Single-player video games